Dapat Alam Mo! is a Philippine television news magazine program broadcast by GTV and GMA Network. Hosted by GMA News anchor Emil Sumangil, TV hostess Patricia Tumulak and trivia expert Kim Atienza, it premiered on October 18, 2021, on GTV's evening lineup. The show also begun airing on GMA Network on February 14, 2022, replacing Wowowin on the network's Telebabad line up. The show ended its simulcast on GMA Network on March 18, 2022. It was replaced by Family Feud on its timeslot on GMA Network.

The show is streaming online on YouTube.

History
GTV unveiled a new program named as Dapat Alam Mo! in early September 2021, with Emil Sumangil and Patricia Tumulak revealed as first hosts of the show. In September 2021, the hosts were introduced including Kim Atienza.

The show begun its provisional simulcast on GMA Network on February 14, 2022, replacing Wowowin. The show ended airing on GMA Network on March 18, 2022.

Hosts
 Emil Sumangil
 Patricia Tumulak
 Kim Atienza

Interim host
 Susan Enriquez
 Oscar Oida

Segments 

 Serbisyo On The Spot
 Shout Out
 SWAT (Sumangil, Walang Atrasan)
 Kakabakaba
 Take Eat Away
 OMG (Oh My Ganap)
 Patok sa TikTok
 Kim's Fordi
 Kwentong Kalye
 Dami Mong Alam Kuya Kim

References

External links
 

2021 Philippine television series debuts
Filipino-language television shows
GMA Network original programming
GMA Integrated News and Public Affairs shows
GTV (Philippine TV network) original programming
Sign language television shows